Northshore High School in Slidell, Louisiana, United States, serves a population of approximately 14,000 in its district. Northshore, which serves small portions of northern and eastern Slidell, is a part of the St. Tammany Parish Public Schools.

The students of Northshore High are residents of a suburban community east and across the lake from the city of New Orleans. Slidell's population is just over 29,000. The school was incorporated in 1982 and was the fourth high school to serve the Slidell area. It began as a school for approximately 800 students and has increased in population to its present level. The school year follows the St. Tammany Parish School Board calendar and provides 178 instructional days for ninth through twelfth grades.

Facilities have changed over the 28 years since the initial construction of Northshore High. As population increased, additional wings have been added to the main building.

Athletics
Northshore High athletics competes in the LHSAA.

Notable alumni
 Ryan Eades, baseball player
 Logan Morrison, baseball player

References

External links
 Northshore High School website

Public high schools in Louisiana
Schools in St. Tammany Parish, Louisiana
Slidell, Louisiana